Masego is a Tswana/Pedi name (a Bantu tribe found in Botswana and South Africa) meaning blessings that may refer to:
Masego (musician) (born 1993), modern hip hop artist who utilizes elements of jazz and house music
Masego Kgomo (c. 1999–2009), murdered South African girl whose body parts were sold for rituals
Masego Loate (born 1982), South African basketball player 
Maps Maponyane (born Masego Maponyane in 1990), South African television presenter, actor, fashion designer, speaker and model
Masego Ntshingane (born 1978), Botswana football midfielder

See also
Maseko